This is a list of women who are or have been members of the Senedd.

The Senedd (Welsh Parliament) has sixty seats. At each election the Senedd has returned some of the highest rates of female representation in the world. At the 2003 election 30 women and 30 men were elected. Following a by-election in 2006 there were 31 women and 29 men who all served until the 2007 election.

Following the May 2021 election there are 26 women and 34 men.

 List of female members of the Senedd

Notes

References 

 *
Women
National Assembly
Lists of women legislators in the United Kingdom